Janashia is a Georgian surname that may refer to:

 Davit Janashia (born 1972), Georgian footballer and coach
 Nikoloz Janashia (1931–1982), Georgian historian and public benefactor
 Simon Janashia (1900–1947), Georgian historian and public benefactor
 Zaza Janashia (born 1976), Georgian footballer and coach
 Konstantine Janashia (born 1990), Georgian strongman

Surnames of Abkhazian origin
Georgian-language surnames